Milton John Daniels (April 18, 1838 – December 1, 1914) was an American Civil War veteran and politician who served one term as a U.S. Representative from California from 1903 to 1905.

Biography 
Born in Cobleskill (village), New York, Daniels attended the public schools. His family moved to Bradford County, Pennsylvania, and he worked with his father in the lumber business.  He moved to Rochester, Minnesota, in 1856, and was appointed deputy postmaster of Rochester in 1859.  In 1860 he entered Middlebury Academy, Wyoming County, New York.

During the Civil War he volunteered for service on April 23, 1861. Returning to Minnesota in August 1862, he raised a company and was commissioned second lieutenant of Company F, Ninth Regiment, Minnesota Volunteers.  During the Indian War of 1862, he took command of the Third Minnesota Mounted Infantry. In 1863, he joined his company at St. Louis in 1863, and was commissioned captain.  In March 1865 was commissioned captain and commissary of subsistence by President Lincoln.

After the war he returned to Minnesota and engaged in banking.  Later he served as member of the Minnesota State House of Representatives from 1882-1886 and in the Minnesota State Senate from 1886–1890. He also served as president of the Minnesota State Board of Asylums for the Insane from 1882–1888.

He moved to California in 1889 and located in Riverside where he engaged in horticultural pursuits.

Congress 
Daniels was elected as a Republican to the Fifty-eighth Congress (March 4, 1903 – March 3, 1905).  He did not run for renomination to the Fifty-ninth Congress.

Later career and death 
He resumed his occupation as horticulturist in Riverside until his death there on December 1, 1914.

He was interred in Evergreen Cemetery.

References

External links

People from Riverside, California
Burials at Evergreen Cemetery (Riverside, California)
1838 births
1914 deaths
Union Army officers
People from Cobleskill, New York
People of Minnesota in the American Civil War
Republican Party members of the Minnesota House of Representatives
Republican Party Minnesota state senators
Politicians from Rochester, Minnesota
American horticulturists
Republican Party members of the United States House of Representatives from California
19th-century American politicians
Military personnel from California